Coenobiodes is a genus of moths belonging to the subfamily Olethreutinae of the family Tortricidae.

Species
Coenobiodes abietiella (Matsumura, 1931)
Coenobiodes acceptana Kuznetzov, 1973
Coenobiodes euryochra (Bradley, 1962)
Coenobiodes granitalis (Butler, 1881)
Coenobiodes melanocosma (Turner, 1916)

See also
List of Tortricidae genera

References

External links
tortricidae.com

Eucosmini
Tortricidae genera